Qeshlaq-e Dehnow (also Romanized as Qeshlāq-e Dehnow; also known as Qeshlāq, Qeshlāq-e Kheyrābād, and Qishlāq) is a village in Almahdi Rural District, Jowkar District, Malayer County, Hamadan Province, Iran. At the 2006 census, its population was 405, in 80 families.

References 

Populated places in Malayer County